Moisés Constantino Henriques (born 1 February 1987) is a Portugal-born Australian professional cricketer who plays for Australia, New South Wales and the Sydney Sixers. An all-rounder, he is the first cricketer born in Portugal to play for Australia in an international match.

Under-19s career

At 16 years of age, Henriques was selected for the Australian U-19 cricket team's squad for the 2004 U-19 Cricket World Cup in Bangladesh, where he took 11 wickets at 19.27 and scored 95 runs at 19.00.

In September 2005, Henriques was named in Australia's U-19 squad to tour India for a One Day series against the Indian U-19 cricket team. Whilst Australia lost the series, in difficult conditions, Henriques was a stand out. He scored 132 runs at an average of 44.00 and claimed 8 wickets at 18.25.

Henriques was named captain of the Australian U-19 team for the 2006 U-19 Cricket World Cup in Sri Lanka, and performed to great acclaim as he led the Australians to a semi-final berth. He was a stand out player of the tournament, scoring 150 runs at 37.50 and finished as the World Cup's leading wicket-taker, claiming 16 wickets at 10.52 in 5 matches.

During his time in the Australian U-19 team, he played 17 matches, taking 35 wickets at 15.08 and scored 377 runs at an average of 31.41.

Moises Henriques is the joint leading wicket taker along with Greg Thompson in the history of Under-19 Cricket World Cup with 27 scalps.

Domestic career

On 2 January 2006, Henriques made his List A debut for New South Wales against Victoria. He bowled 8 overs for 46 runs in a narrow New South Wales victory. His appearance, at only 18 years of age, made him the youngest ever List A debutant for New South Wales. Six days later, Henriques made his Twenty20 debut, but did not bat or bowl in that match.

He made his first-class debut against South Australia at the Sydney Cricket Ground on 17 October 2006. Only a week after this match, Henriques took 5/17 against Queensland with fast bowling. In doing so, he became the youngest New South Wales cricketer to take 5 wickets in a first-class innings since Doug Walters   However, due to injury, this was the last first-class game Henriques played for over a year. After regaining fitness and impressive performances for his club, St George, in Sydney Grade Cricket, he earned a place in the squad once again.

He was signed by the Kolkata Knight Riders franchise for $300,000 to play in the Indian Premier League during the 2009 season. In 2010, he was traded to the Delhi Daredevils in exchange for Manoj Tiwary.

In 2012 he played part of the English season for Glamorgan.

In September 2012 he scored his first first-class century, 161 not out off 229 balls against Tasmania at Bankstown.

Since then, he has produced some very consistent performances with both bat and ball, a highlight recently in the Matador One Day Cup where he scored 131 against Victoria which was his first List A century. He is the captain of NSW. He is injured but will return towards the end of November.

In June 2015, while playing for Surrey in a NatWest t20 Blast game against Sussex Sharks at Arundel Castle, Henriques collided with teammate Rory Burns while attempting to take a catch.  Both players were knocked unconscious from the collision and Henriques suffered a broken jaw.  Ambulances and medical staff treated the players on-field before taking them both to hospital. The game was abandoned due to the injuries.

Henriques again got injured during the 2014–15 Big Bash League season with a recurrence of his calf injury.

2017–18 season

Henriques played one match for New South Wales in the 2017–18 JLT One-Day Cup against Western Australia before traveling to India to play for Australia in a Twenty20 International series. He captained the side and scored 72 runs from 70 deliveries, but they weren't able to win the match.

T20 franchise career
Moises Henriques used to play for the Mumbai Indians in the IPL 4, but was ruled out of the squad because of adductor muscle injury. He was released from his contract with the Mumbai Indians team for IPL and was later picked up by Royal Challengers Bangalore in the player auction 2013 for the IPL-6. After some good time with Sunrisers Hyderabad from 2014 to 2017, in December 2018, he was bought by the Kings XI Punjab in the player auction for the 2019 Indian Premier League. But he couldn't feature in the IPL 2019 due to an ankle injury and was later released by Kings XI Punjab before IPL 2020.

In July 2019, he was selected to play for the Glasgow Giants in the inaugural edition of the Euro T20 Slam cricket tournament. However, the following month the tournament was cancelled. He was released by the Kings XI Punjab ahead of the 2020 IPL auction. In February 2021, Henriques was bought by the Punjab Kings in the IPL auction ahead of the 2021 Indian Premier League.

In the Big Bash League, Henriques captained Sydney Sixers to consecutive title victories in 2019-20 and 2020-21 seasons. He was also a part of the winning squad in the inaugural BBL final in 2011-12, where he scored 70(41) in the final.

International career

Henriques made his full international debut in a Twenty20 International against New Zealand in Sydney on 15 February 2009, but he was run out for only 1 run. In October, Henriques was called up, after injuries to Brett Lee and James Hopes, during Australia's tour of India. James Hopes had injured his hamstring. Ironically, soon after Henriques played in Hopes' place, he too injured his hamstring. 
In 2013, Henriques was selected in Australia's Test cricket team during the tour of India making his test debut and then scored his maiden half- century with 68 runs in the 1st innings of the 1st test backing it up with 81 not out in the 2nd innings. In 2017, he got back into the Australian squad for a trip to England and Wales for the ICC Champions Trophy which was eventually won by Pakistan. After a long three years gap from international cricket, Henriques returned to the national side for Australia's series against India in 2020. He also got a first test call up after four years against India in 2020.

Personal life

The son of former Portuguese professional footballer, Álvaro, Henriques was born in Funchal, Madeira, Portugal, before moving to Australia with his family at the age of one. 
He graduated from Endeavour Sports High School in 2004, yet while attending high school he represented New South Wales and Australia at Under 17 and Under 19 level. In 2004 he was the recipient of the first Rexona Australian Youth Cricket Scholarship, an initiative backed by Ricky Ponting.

In 2018, Henriques revealed he was suffering from depression and stepped down as captain of New South Wales.

Playing style
A genuine all-rounder, Henriques states that he "couldn't choose" between batting and bowling as his preferred art. Despite this, some have commented that his bowling is slightly better than his batting. As a right-handed batsman, Henriques bats in the middle to lower order, and as a right-arm medium-fast bowler he generally opens the attack. His style has been compared to Australian Shane Watson, but Henriques looks to South African all-rounder Jacques Kallis as a source of inspiration.

Career best performances

See also
 List of Test cricketers born in non-Test playing nations

References

External links

 

1987 births
Australian people of Portuguese descent
Australia One Day International cricketers
Australia Test cricketers
Australia Twenty20 International cricketers
Australian cricketers
Delhi Capitals cricketers
Glamorgan cricketers
Kolkata Knight Riders cricketers
Living people
Mumbai Indians cricketers
New South Wales cricketers
Sportspeople from Funchal
Portuguese emigrants to Australia
Portuguese expatriate sportspeople in Australia
Royal Challengers Bangalore cricketers
Sunrisers Hyderabad cricketers
Surrey cricketers
Sydney Sixers cricketers
People educated at Endeavour Sports High School
Punjab Kings cricketers
Portuguese cricketers